The Jay Dayton Smith House is located Las Vegas, Nevada, within the Las Vegas High School Neighborhood Historic District and is currently used as an office.

The building was added to the National Register of Historic Places on February 20, 1987.

References

External links

Houses on the National Register of Historic Places in Nevada
National Register of Historic Places in Las Vegas
Houses in Clark County, Nevada